Tillandsia punctulata is a species of flowering plant in the genus Tillandsia. This species is native to Central America (all 7 countries) and Mexico.

Cultivars
 Tillandsia 'Tina'

References

punctulata
Flora of Central America
Flora of Mexico
Plants described in 1831